Paula Sherman is an Algonquin writer, activist and educator.  She is of Omàmìwinini (Algonquin) heritage and a Family Head on Ka-Pishkawandemin, the traditional governing council for the Ardoch Algonquin First Nation. She is also a professor of Indigenous Studies at Trent University, in Peterborough, Ontario.  Her recent book entitled Dishonour of the Crown:  The Ontario Resource Regime in the Valley of the Kiji Sibi chronicles the Ardoch community's struggle to prevent uranium prospecting on their traditional lands and is published by Arbeiter Ring Publishing, Winnipeg, MB.  She is also a contributor to Lighting the Eighth Fire:  The Liberation, Resurgence and Protection of Indigenous Nations, a collection of essays writing by emerging Indigenous activists and academics edited by Mississauga academic Leanne Betasamosake Simpson.

References

Bibliography 
 Dishonour of the Crown: The Ontario Resource Regime in the Valley of the Kiji Sibi, 2008, Arbeiter Ring Publishing, Winnipeg, MB.

External links
https://web.archive.org/web/20081222171609/http://www.arbeiterring.com/new/dishonour.html
http://arbeiterring.com/books/detail/lighting-the-eighth-fire/
https://web.archive.org/web/20131010015022/http://www.trentu.ca/academic/nativestudies/faculty.html
https://web.archive.org/web/20081222200210/http://www.aafna.ca/family_council.html
http://www.dominionpaper.ca/articles/1754

20th-century births
First Nations activists
Living people
Algonquin people
Academic staff of Trent University
First Nations women writers
21st-century First Nations writers
21st-century Canadian non-fiction writers
21st-century Canadian women writers
Canadian women non-fiction writers
Year of birth missing (living people)
Canadian indigenous women academics
First Nations academics